Socialist Students' Union of Sri Lanka (SSU)  also known as Samajavadi Shishya Sangameya is a students' union in Sri Lanka that operates as the students' wing of the Marxist-Leninist Janatha Vimukthi Peramuna.

It is currently a member of the Inter-university Students' Federation.

Ssu beginning around 1968.its first name is the samajawadi sangamaya.The SSU is the oldest of student unions in Sri Lanka that promotes 
Communism. Launched in 1968 by radical Marxist Rohana Wijeweera; It was able to start recruiting youths from both universities and independent student council; by 1970 the SSU was dominant in student politics and was able to operate as the armed wing of the JVP in 1970 especially during the period of The United Front. Comrade Shanta Bandara was the founding general secretary of the Socialist Students Union. All the general secretaries who succeeded him (before 1990) were killed in the struggle by the United National Party government that was in power at that time. Comrade Lalith Wijayaratne, Comrade HB Herath, Comrade DM Ananda, Comrade Upali Jayaweera, Comrade Ananda Idamegama, Comrade Dr Nissanka, Comrade Atula Senaratne. SSU together with the Patriotic Students' Union was banned in 1988.After 1990, the Socialist Students Union was again reformed. Comrade Anura Dissanayake was its founding general secretary. Comrade Sunil Handunnetthi, Comrade Bimal Ratnayake and Comrade Mangala Kuruppu became general secretaries after him.

References

External links
 Official website

Communism in Sri Lanka
1965 establishments in Ceylon
1971 JVP insurrection
Students' unions in Sri Lanka
Student wings of communist parties